Van Houdt or Vanhoudt is a surname. Notable people with the surname include:

Jan Van Houdt, Belgian engineer
Peter Van Houdt (born 1976), Belgian footballer
Pierre Van Houdt (born 1914), Belgian fencer
Tom Vanhoudt (born 1972), Belgian tennis player

Surnames of Dutch origin